Kostelní Lhota is a municipality and village in Nymburk District in the Central Bohemian Region of the Czech Republic. It has about 900 inhabitants.

Geography
It lies in a flat landscape in the Central Elbe Table. The Výrovka River flows along the eastern and northeastern municipal border. The Šembera River, its tributary, flows along the northwestern border.

History
The first written mention of Kostelní Lhota is from 1354.

Transport
The D11 motorway (part of the European route E67) from Prague to Hradec Králové passes through the municipality.

Sights
The landmark of Kostelní Lhota is the Church of the Assumption of the Virgin Mary. It was built in the late Baroque style in 1817.

Notable people
Josef Musil (1932–2017), volleyball player

References

External links

Villages in Nymburk District